Noel Bradley (born 17 December 1957) is an Irish former footballer who played in the Football League for Bury and Chester. He mainly played as a full back and was well known for his long throw from throw-ins.

Playing career
Bradley started his career with Manchester City, although he did not join them on full-time terms until he was 21 due to studying for a degree. He did not make any league appearances for City but captained the reserves.

He spent the closing stages of 1979–80 on loan at Bury, who he joined permanently in the summer of 1981. The following summer he moved to Chester, who had just been relegated to the Fourth Division. He was to spend the campaign playing in several different positions, most memorably in goal after Phil Harrington was injured in a 1–0 win at Torquay United near the end of the 1982–83 season, he achieved a score of 10 from the Sunday People newspaper for this very appearance.

Despite his versatility, Bradley was released at the end of the season and joined non-league side Mossley. After just 11 games he moved on after being refused a pay rise and later played for Witton Albion, Colwyn Bay and Chester based side Christleton, where he became player-manager.
Away from football he has managed a children's home in Wrexham. 
Noel Bradley has two children.

References

1957 births
Living people
Association footballers from County Donegal
Republic of Ireland association footballers
Association football fullbacks
Manchester City F.C. players
Bury F.C. players
Chester City F.C. players
Mossley A.F.C. players
Witton Albion F.C. players
Colwyn Bay F.C. players
Christleton F.C. players
English Football League players
Republic of Ireland football managers